Adrian Hodges (born 4 February 1957) is an English television and film writer. He has won a BAFTA Award.

Life and career
He began his career in journalism for Screen International magazine  and his screenwriting debut was the 1991 television drama Tell Me That You Love Me, followed by screenplays for The Bridge (1992) and Tom & Viv (1994) for which Miranda Richardson and Rosemary Harris both received Oscar nominations.

After his film adaptation of Julian Barnes's Metroland (1997) Hodges concentrated on writing for television, including Amongst Women (1998), his adaptation of John McGahern's novel for BBC Two, which received a BAFTA award for Best Serial and won the Grand Prix award at the Banff Television Festival, The Lost World (2001) and Charles II: The Power and The Passion (2003).

In 2005 he wrote the episode "Triumph" for the HBO-BBC series Rome. He has since adapted two of Philip Pullman's Sally Lockhart stories for TV: The Ruby in the Smoke (2006) and The Shadow in the North (production completed 2007).

He is co-creator of the ITV sci-fi drama Primeval, for which he wrote nine episodes in five series. In 2008 he was also reported to be working on and a new adaptation of Silas Marner.

On 22 November 2007, the BBC announced that they were going to remake Survivors, as written by Adrian Hodges. Two series were shown on BBC One, in 2008 and 2010.

Hodges wrote the screenplay for the 2011 film My Week with Marilyn.

Adrian Hodges created the BBC television series The Musketeers, based on the Alexandre Dumas characters, which aired its first season from January to March 2014.

Writing credits

Awards and nominations

References

External links
 

1957 births
20th-century British male writers
21st-century British male writers
British television writers
British male screenwriters
British science fiction writers
Living people